The initialism ISV may refer to:

Technology 
 Independent software vendor
 Infantry Squad Vehicle
 Internal security vehicle, armoured vehicle
 International scientific vocabulary

Other 
 Cardiff International Sports Village
 International Standard Version of the Bible
 International Student Volunteers
 "ISV", the International Olympic Committee (IOC) country code for the United States Virgin Islands
 Immediate Support Vessel of the Indian Navy